Lieutenant General Adham Akromovich Ahmedbaev (born February 14, 1966) is an Uzbek politician who has been Uzbekistan's Minister of Internal Affairs from 2013 till 2017. Now he is the State Advisor of the President of Uzbekistan.

Born in Tashkent in 1966, Ahmedbaev studied at Tashkent State University and earned an economics degree in 1988. From 1990 to 2000 he worked in the Department of Internal Affairs of Tashkent region. He was deputy head of the department from 2000 to 2004. From 2004 to 2006 he worked in the Office of the President of Uzbekistan. In 2006 he was named Deputy Minister of Internal Affairs of Uzbekistan on Finance, serving until 2011. From June 2011 to December 2013 Ahmedbaev was First Deputy Minister of Internal Affairs of Uzbekistan.

On December 13, 2013, President Islam Karimov appointed Ahmedbaev to be the chief of the Interior Ministry of Uzbekistan. The relevant Decree UP-4585 was signed by Karimov. He assumed the position after Bahodir Matlyubov was dismissed as interior minister. Ahmedbaev's selection was seen as demonstrating the power of Rustam Inoyatov and the Tashkent clan, of which Ahmedbaev is a member. He was awarded the rank of lieutenant on August 22, 2014. 

On January 4, 2017, President Shavkat Mirziyoyev appointed him to be the State Advisor of the President. On March 1, 2017, he was dismissed from the post of State Advisor of the President for health reasons, then continued to serve at the Academy of the Ministry of Internal Affairs of Uzbekistan until November 2017.

References

External links
Ministry of Internal Affairs

1966 births
Living people
Government ministers of Uzbekistan
Uzbekistani politicians